The Juréia Formation is a geological formation of the Santos Basin offshore of the Brazilian states of Rio de Janeiro, São Paulo, Paraná and Santa Catarina. The formation is a reservoir rock of the Merluza Field, the first discovery in the Santos Basin.

Etymology 
The formation is named after the Juréia-Itatins Ecological Station, São Paulo.

Description 

The formation is characterized by dark grey to greenish and brown shales, dark grey siltstones, fine-very fine sandstones and light ochre calcisilts. The depositional environment is thought to be of a marine platform setting as pro-delta facies on the shelf edge. The age based on palynomorphs and calcareous nanofossils is Late Cretaceous (Santonian-Maastrichtian). Two new ostracod species were identified in the drilling cuttings of wells drilled into the Santonian-Campanian section, ?Afrocytheridea cretacea and Pelecocythere dinglei.

The formation is the reservoir rock of the Merluza Field, the first discovery in 1979 of the Santos Basin.

See also 

 Campos Basin

References

Bibliography 
 
 
 
 
 

Geologic formations of Brazil
Santos Basin
Cretaceous Brazil
Upper Cretaceous Series of South America
Maastrichtian Stage of South America
Campanian Stage
Santonian Stage
Shale formations
Siltstone formations
Sandstone formations
Turbidite deposits
Reservoir rock formations
Petroleum in Brazil
Formations
Formations
Formations
Formations
Tupi–Guarani languages